BlackPlanet is an African-American social networking service for matchmaking and job postings; it also has forums for discussion on political and social issues.

BlackPlanet was launched on September 1, 2001 by Omar Wasow, an Internet analyst, who in 2001 was running "New York Online", a pre-web community he started in 1993 from his living room in Brooklyn. It was the brainchild of Wasow and Community Connect's CEO Benjamin Sun. Launched in 1999, it was a relative latecomer to social media sites, with three already in existence targeting people of color. Benjamin Sun would also launch AsianAve and MiGente.com.

Company
The website is run by Community Connect of New York City. Community Connect has also run AsianAvenue.com and MiGente.com In April 2008, Community Connect was purchased for $38 million by Radio One, a Lanham, MD-based media begun by Cathy Hughes. Along with BlackPlanet.com, MiGente.com and AsianAvenue.com were also purchased. This move was taken by Radio One to diversify beyond radio to reach black audiences.

BlackPlanet's broader mission is to strengthen the Black community.

Website
The most popular forums were Current Events, Heritage & Identity, Relationships, Religion & Spirituality, and Women. Wasow says BlackPlanet's home-grown software allows users to move between personal pages, to dating, chat, and message boards, focusing on connecting people, rather than feeding them content.

Statistics
In January 2007, the membership log on BlackPlanet's home-page boasted 15.8 million registered users since its inception in 1999.
At time of purchase the site had around 20 million members and was the fourth most-visited U.S. social networking site.

Target Audience 

Male 34.4%
Female 65.6%
Median Age: 32
Attended/Grad College: 64.5%
Composition Black: 88%

"BlackPlanet creates branded profile pages to integrate advertisers into the social community, enabling members to engage as friends"; as well as personal profiles BlackPlanet also allows pages for brands, personalities, and products.

In 2009, BlackPlanet introduced new features to the website, including a Facebook-style status update, and a news bar that keeps users up-to-date with information shared on Interactive One and BlackPlanet. The chat function was also updated in 2009; the current chat is powered by a company called Chat Blazer and is Flash based.

In early 2010, BlackPlanet launched a new homepage that included an Activity Feed, allowing users to see updates from everyone on BlackPlanet, either friends or by location.

Other features

BlackPlanet has recently introduced two interactive games for users, Farmandia and Fishdom.

BlackPlanet describes Farmandia as follows: "Farmandia puts you in the farmer's seat. Grow your produce, care for your animals and build your barns. The more you play, the more points you're rewarded so you can keep your farm in business. Need a little help? Invite other BlackPlanet members to lend a hand."

BlackPlanet describes Fishdom thusly; "When you're done spending time on the farm, grab your virtual fishing rod and head to Fishdom where you're responsible for feeding your exotic collection of underwater friends. You better earn your bucks because they get mighty hungry. You never know when you'll need to purchase more food, accessorize your underwater kingdom or give your fish some new friends."

The similarities to Facebook's Farmville have not gone unnoticed by the BlackPlanet users, who point out the need for improvement of the site's infrastructure and principal features such as chat prior to the introduction of games.

Mobile applications
BlackPlanet also introduced mobile apps in 2009 for mobile phones. The application BlackPlanetMobile was free when it was introduced but was not exclusive of mobile provider charges. BlackPlanetMobile did not work on the BlackBerry, GPhone, iPhone, or Sidekick smartphones when introduced.

BlackPlanet Text Alerts are also available to alert users to updates and notifications. This is an opt-in
service.

Social networks
It has been stated that online social networks have come to define the modern Internet experience.

BlackPlanet, as a precursor to Facebook and Myspace, has gone some way to influencing the Internet as users recognise it. Before today's popular networks allowed you to "like" posts, "poke" crushes, or "retweet" celebrities, web-savvy African Americans were connecting on BlackPlanet.

Wasow himself has stated"

As of June 2007, BlackPlanet had 16.5 million members and 80 million page views. It was described as the largest online media entity for African-Americans and "the granddaddy of social-networking sites". BlackPlanet enjoyed more than 6 million unique visitors a month in April 2008. In 2007, BlackPlanet found itself to be the fourth most popular social networking tool on the internet, but with the vast increase in Facebook, Twitter and MySpace usage, BlackPlanet fails to gain recognition in the top 15 social networks according to eBizMBA, in March 2011, leading critics to suggest
that 'BlackPlanet has fallen to the wayside as other networks have taken the social network mantle.'

BlackPlanet utilises other social networking tools such as Twitter and Facebook in order to reach new and potential users. Its Twitter feed is updated on a near daily basis, commenting and highlighting points of interest to the black community. Recent tweets include: "83% of BP voters think non-Black rappers shouldn't use the #nword... what do you think about that?" and, "Weave secrets revealed. Go from drab to fab in 5 minutes." The BlackPlanet Twitter feed is also used to post announcements and updates regarding the BlackPlanet site itself. Wider political issues are also mentioned, including: "What will you do #ifgovernmentshutsdown?"

The BlackPlanet Facebook page is used to encourage discussion of issues both directly and indirectly applicable to its community of African-American users. The Facebook status update feature is used to ask questions to the page followers, and is well responded to in general. Questions have included, "What do you think of the idea of Black Marriage Day?", "What do you think of people using the term 'ghetto' when describing something that's not desirable?", and, "Men, do you ever pamper yourself with a gentleman's facial, manicure or pedicure? Ladies, what do you think of men who take care of their skin and nails?"

Both social networking tools are used to advertise the "Member of the Day" feature, drawing attention to the appearance of the chosen member. Accompanying a link to the member's profile is a short comment such as, "She's beautiful, she's single, she's our member of the day. Check her out", and, "Still need proof that we have the prettiest members on the planet? You're welcome."

Ethics
Wasow says he occasionally gets questions about whether BlackPlanet is fostering racial separatism. "Voluntarily socializing with people who share your interests is what freedom is all about," he says. "Anybody can join any of the sites. We found we were not segregating the web."

However, niche community tools such as BlackPlanet do host users who wish to promote separatism, such as gangs, and this has not gone unnoticed. Finding gangs on GeoCities, BlackPlanet, and especially Myspace, along with other internet service providers (ISPs), provided the foundation of what today is known as gang internet investigation, a specialized area of expertise in gang investigation.

Gary Dauphin, an original employee of BlackPlanet, argues that while the ethnicity of the site's owners is important to understanding the site, owners of one ethnicity can sometimes serve an audience of another ethnicity. "BlackPlanet, where I got my start on the Web, was owned for most of its early life by a largely Asian American group, and I would venture that that period was the site's finest hour. The ownership wasn't African-American, but it did understand the underlying call to service implied in running an ethnic site, and moreover, they had high ambitions for their company as a Web community platform provider that raised the bar for BP overall."

Lawsuit
In October 2011, an anonymous model filed a federal lawsuit against BlackPlanet.com regarding a 2007 incident in which she was drugged and raped by two men who met the woman through the website.  The two men (40-year-old Lavont Flanders, Jr. and 45-year-old Emerson Callum) were convicted by a federal jury in Miami in December 2011 of multiple sex-related and conspiracy charges and were sentenced to life in prison.  The woman alleges that BlackPlanet.com "failed to warn women about the dangers of sexual predators". The site's parent company told the Miami Herald it "vehemently" denies the allegations.

In the press
In 2007,  BlackPlanet was featured in the press when the U.S. Department of Defense or the Pentagon banned it amongst other sites in order to free up bandwidth, suggesting high usage levels. Other banned sites included: filecabi.com, Hi5, iFilm, Metacafe, MTV.com, Myspace, Pandora Radio, Photobucket, StupidVideos, and YouTube.
The Defense network contains more than 15,000 local and regional networks and more than five million computers in the grid.

BlackPlanet gained considerable publicity when Senator Barack Obama began using the site on October 5, 2007, during his presidential campaign bid.  Within 10 days, he had gained nearly 200,000 friends. In an online poll conducted by the site, over 2/3 of BlackPlanet's online community stated their intention to vote in the 2008 election. The media perceived this participation in a niche social networking tool to be a "smart move" by the Senator. On March 30, 2011, President Obama had 450,579 friends on BlackPlanet. The page continues to be updated with regular blog posts, but does not feature recent status updates.

BlackPlanet Rising

BlackPlanet Rising is a BlackPlanet users' community project set up by the website to encourage community support and services by its members. As part of their mission they aim to motivate and involve individuals to participate in civic engagement. BlackPlanet Rising hosts a blog which contains posts from BlackPlanet users. Featured authors are highlighted along with their contributions to the site.

Donations
BlackPlanet Rising works with a charitable organization called DonorsChoose, which connects users to offer donations of critical resources, such as books, supplies, computers, field trips and guest speakers to public schools. The choice of donations and projects to support is available through BlackPlanet Rising and DonorsChoose. "Double Your Impact" support programs involve BlackPlanet Rising's matching user donations.

BlackPlanet Rising's Giving page via DonorsChoose had reached $11,023 donated by 36 donors, reaching 5,190 students in April 2011.

Events
Past events organised by BlackPlanet Rising include fundraisers for earthquake and tsunami relief projects, volunteer drives for causes such as homelessness, and the launch of TelAfric at the Houston Museum of African American Culture, March 2011.

Volunteers
BlackPlanet Rising's VolunteerMatch site matches user's locations with volunteer opportunities in their area. They quote Barack Obama's election as President as a call for users to "bring a new energy and agenda to our country".
 
Volunteer opportunities include educational programs, health programs, social rights programs and other opportunities to support one's community.

Riser of the Month

The BlackPlanet Rising community campaign has identified a "Riser of the Month" since September 2010. These are often political and social advocates, and community activists who support the African-American community. The website contains a feature article on the individual chosen each month. 
Risers of the Month include:
Janks Morton – March 2011
Kevin Powell – February 2011
Mike Oxlittle – January 2011
Oni Joseph – November 2010
Ryan Mack – October 2010
George L. Cook III – September 2010

See also
 Blackvoices.com
List of social networking websites

References

External links

African-American mass media
Companies based in New York City
Internet properties established in 1999
1999 establishments in New York City
African-American culture